Kusuman Hospital is the main hospital of Kusuman District, Sakon Nakhon Province, Thailand and is classified under the regional health 8 (R8WAY), Ministry of Public Health as a community hospital (F2 level) with a capacity of 60 beds (actual service 40 beds)

History 
Kusuman Hospital was first constructed in 1983 as one building with a capacity of 10 beds. It was officially opened on 1 October 1983. In 1988 (5 years ago), the hospital became classified as a community hospital (F2 level) and expanded to 30 beds. In 1997 (9 years ago), the number of beds expanded to 60 and Now the hospital with a capacity of 60 beds (actual service 40 beds)

Location 
Kusuman Hospital located in Na Pho Subdistrict, Kusuman District, Sakon Nakhon Province, about 4 kilometers far from the Kusuman government center and about 37 kilometers far from Sakon Nakhon Province

See also 

 Health in Thailand
 Hospitals in Thailand
 List of hospitals in Thailand

References 

Hospitals in Thailand
Sakon Nakhon province